Nationality words link to articles with information on the nation's poetry or literature (for instance, Irish or France).

Events

Works published

Great Britain
 Charles Bansley, The Pride of Women
 Robert Crowley, One and Thyrtye Epigrammes
 John Heywood, An Hundred Epigrammes
 William Langland (attributed), Piers Plowman, the B text
 Sir Thomas Wyatt, Pentential Psalms

France
 Joachim du Bellay, Musagnoeomachie
 Pierre de Ronsard:
 Bocage
 Odes, the first four books

Births
Death years link to the corresponding "[year] in poetry" article:
 12 April – Edward de Vere, 17th Earl of Oxford (died 1604), English courtier, playwright, poet, sportsman, patron of numerous writers, and sponsor of at least two acting companies
 Also:
 Baothghalach Mór Mac Aodhagáin (died 1600), Irish poet part of the Mac Aodhagáin clan
 Kasper Miakskowski (died 1622), Polish
 Alexander Montgomerie (died 1598), Scottish
 Mikolaj Sep Szarzynski born about this year (died c. 1581), Polish
 Shlomo Ephraim Luntschitz (died 1619), rabbi, poet and Torah commentator
 Richard Rowlands (died 1640), Anglo-Dutch antiquarian and writer
 Cristóbal de Virués (died 1614), Spanish playwright and poet
 Syed Sultan (died 1648), Bengali poet

Deaths

Birth years link to the corresponding "[year] in poetry" article:
 February – Marcantonio Flaminio (born 1498), Italian, Latin-language poet
 June 2 – Guillaume Bigot (born 1502), French writer, doctor, humanist and poet in French and Latin
 June 12 – Cristobal de Castillejo (born c. 1490), Spanish
 June 13 – Veronica Gambara (born 1485), Italian poet, stateswoman and political leader
 November 7 – Jón Arason (born 1484), Icelandic Roman Catholic bishop and poet, executed
Also:
 Pir Sultan Abdal (born c. 1480), Ottoman Empire
 Nicholas Bourbon (born 1503 or 1505), French court preceptor and poet
 Gian Giorgio Trissino (born 1478), Italian Renaissance humanist, poet, dramatist, diplomat and grammarian

See also
 Poetry
 16th century in poetry
 16th century in literature
 Dutch Renaissance and Golden Age literature
 French Renaissance literature
 Renaissance literature

 Spanish Renaissance literature

Notes

16th-century poetry
Poetry